The following list includes notable people who were born or have lived in Joliet, Illinois. For a similar list organized alphabetically by last name, see the category page People from Joliet, Illinois.

Acting 

 John Barrowman (born 1967), actor (Doctor Who, Torchwood)
 Nora Bayes (1880–1928), actress, singer, and comedian
 John Beck (born 1943), actor (The Other Side of Midnight, Rollerball)
 Jodi Carlisle (born 1960), actress (The Wild Thornberrys)
 Tyler Christopher (born 1972), actor (General Hospital)
 JoAnn Dean Killingsworth (1923–2015), actress and dancer, first person to play Snow White at Disneyland
 Andy Dick (born 1965), comedian, actor, musician and producer (NewsRadio)
 Janina Gavankar (born 1980), actress, musician (True Blood)
 Kathryn Hays (born 1933), actress (As the World Turns)
 Mercedes McCambridge (1916–2004), actress; 1949 Academy Award for Best Supporting Actress (All the King's Men, Giant)
 Melissa McCarthy (born 1970), actress and comedian (Mike & Molly, Bridesmaids)
 Nick Offerman (born 1970), actor, comedian, and carpenter (Parks and Recreation)
 Larry Parks (1914–1975), stage and film actor (The Jolson Story)
 Anthony Rapp (born 1971), stage and film actor and singer (Rent)
 Lynne Thigpen (1948–2003), Tony Award-winning stage, film and TV actress (Carmen Sandiego, The Paper, Godspell)
 Audrey Totter (1917–2013), actress (Lady in the Lake, Our Man Higgins)
 Vince Vieluf (born 1970), actor (Rat Race)

Academics, arts, and writing 

 Ann Bannon (born 1932), pulp fiction writer
 William Lincoln Bakewell (1888–1969), able seaman on Shackleton Antarctic expedition
 Thomas Bojeski (1946–1974), notable poet writing under the name of Thomas James 
 Charles Bowden (1945–2014), educator and writer
 Robert Todd Carroll (1945–2016), publisher of The Skeptic's Dictionary and fellow of Committee for Skeptical Inquiry
 James Downey (born 1952), head writer for Saturday Night Live
 John Houbolt (1919–2014), aerospace engineer
 Mort Kondracke (born 1939), political commentator and journalist
 Phyllis Reynolds Naylor (born 1933), children's and young adult fiction author
 Robert Novak (1931–2009), syndicated columnist, author, conservative political commentator
 Adam Rapp (born 1968), novelist, playwright, screenwriter, filmmaker and musician
 Johan Reinhard (born 1943), anthropologist, archaeologist
 James J. Stukel (born 1937), 15th President of the University of Illinois (born in Joliet)
 Edwin Way Teale (1899–1980), naturalist, photographer, Pulitzer Prize-winning author
 Adele Fay Williams (1859–1937), artist and newspaper writer, born in Joliet

Business 

 John D. Goeken (1930–2010), founder of MCI Inc. and Airfone
 John Fremont McCullough (1871–1963), co-founder of Dairy Queen; opened first store in Joliet in 1940
 William Cornelius Van Horne (1843–1915), pioneering Canadian railway executive
 Mike Wolfe (born 1964), owner of Antique Archaeology; cast member of American Pickers

Crime 
 Milton Johnson (born 1950), serial killer

Military 

 Joseph F. Ambrose (1896–1988), World War I veteran
 Earl N. Franklin (1917–2003), colonel of the United States Air Force and Tuskegee Airman
Frank Perconte (1917–2003), D-Day veteran, member of Easy Company, 506th parachute infantry regiment, and portrayed in the HBO miniseries Band of Brothers by James Madio.

Modeling 

 Adrianne Curry (born 1982), model, best known as the first winner of America's Next Top Model
 Lois Delander (1911–1985), Miss America 1927

Music 

 Charlie Adams (born 1954), drummer for Chameleon and Yanni, spokesman for Autism Society of America
 John Barrowman (born 1967), Scottish singer, actor, dancer, musical performer and media personality; 1985 graduate of Joliet West High School
 Jimmy Chamberlin (born 1964), drummer, songwriter and producer, formerly of The Smashing Pumpkins
 Mark Carman (born 1960), Grammy nominated producer, songwriter, musician, singer
 Edward Joseph Collins (1886–1951), pianist and composer
 Da Brat (born 1974), born Shawntae Harris, Grammy-nominated rapper and actress; first female solo rap act to have platinum-selling album
 Five Pointe O, alternative rock music group, active 1999 to 2003
 Janina Gavankar (born 1980), actress and musician
 Buffalocomotive, rock band formed in 2004 that recorded the theme song for Inked
 Frank Marocco (1931–2012), accordionist 
 Don Murray (1904–1929), jazz clarinet and saxophone player
 Kerry Muzzey (born 1970), film and television composer
 Ron Nelson (born 1929), composer of classical and semi-classical music, retired music educator
 Ann Nesby (born 1950), R&B, gospel, and dance music singer/songwriter and actress, former lead singer of Sounds of Blackness
 Doug Pinnick (born 1950), bass guitarist, songwriter, and co-lead vocalist for King's X
 Lionel Richie (born 1949), Grammy Award-winning singer-songwriter and record producer, composer of the Academy Award-winning song "Say You, Say Me"
 Steve Rodby (born 1954), bass guitarist for Pat Metheny Group
 Elisabeth Withers, neo-soul and R&B singer-songwriter

Politics and law

 Edward C. Akin (1852–1936), Illinois Attorney General and Mayor of Joliet
 Meade Baltz (1912–1994), businessman and Illinois state legislator
 Richard J. Barr (1865–1951), Illinois State Senator and Mayor of Joliet
 William G. Barr (1920–1987), Illinois state representative and businessman
 George H. Munroe (1844–1912), Illinois State Senator and businessman
 Lewis E. Reed (born 1962), first African-American president of the Board of Aldermen in St. Louis, Missouri (2007–present)
 Lawrence M. Walsh Sr. (born 1948), Illinois State Senator and farmer

Religion 

 Lawrence Jenco (1934–1996), Roman Catholic priest and author; taken hostage in Beirut in January 1985 and held for 564 days
 Roger Kaffer (1927–2009), auxiliary Bishop of the Roman Catholic Diocese of Joliet (1985–2002)

Sports

Baseball 

 Sweetbreads Bailey (1895–1939), pitcher for the Chicago Cubs and Brooklyn Robins
 Rylan Bannon (born 1996), third baseman in the Houston Astros organization
 Jesse Barfield (born 1959), outfielder for the Toronto Blue Jays, New York Yankees, and Yomiuri Giants (Japan)
 Sean Bergman (born 1970), pitcher for five MLB teams and one team in the NPB league of Japan
 Bobby Burke (1907–1971), pitcher for the Washington Senators and Philadelphia Phillies
 Kevin Cameron (born 1979), pitcher for the San Diego Padres and Oakland Athletics
 Mark Carlson (born 1969), umpire in Major League Baseball
 Kelly Dransfeldt (born 1975), shortstop for the Texas Rangers and Chicago White Sox
 Brian Dubois (born 1967), pitcher for the Detroit Tigers
 Gordie Gillespie (1926–2015), coach, member of College Baseball Hall of Fame
 Mike Grace (born 1970), pitcher for the Philadelphia Phillies
 Mark Andrew Grant (born 1963), pitcher for six MLB teams
 Bill Gullickson (born 1959), pitcher for six MLB teams; played baseball at Joliet Catholic Academy
 Larry Gura (born 1947), pitcher for the Chicago Cubs, New York Yankees and Kansas City Royals
 Bill Haller (born 1935), American League umpire and official from 1961 to 1985
 Jack Hendricks (1875–1943), outfielder and manager for several MLB teams
 Ed Lagger (1912–1981), pitcher for the Philadelphia Athletics
 Mark Leiter (born 1963), pitcher for eight MLB teams
 Bernice Metesch (born 1929), All-American Girls Professional Baseball League player
 Chris Michalak (born 1971), pitcher for the Arizona Diamondbacks, Toronto Blue Jays, Texas Rangers and Cincinnati Reds
 Bill Moran (1869–1916), catcher and left fielder for the St. Louis Browns and Chicago Colts
 Margaret Murray, All-American Girls Professional Baseball League player
 Steve Parris (born 1967), pitcher for the Pittsburgh Pirates, Cincinnati Reds, Toronto Blue Jays and Tampa Bay Devil Rays
 Jack Perconte (born 1954), infielder for the Los Angeles Dodgers, Cleveland Indians, Seattle Mariners, and Chicago White Sox; sports writer
 Jeff Reed (born 1962), catcher with six MLB teams
 Ed Spiezio (born 1941), third baseman for the St. Louis Cardinals, San Diego Padres, and Chicago White Sox
 Scott Spiezio (born 1972), infielder for the Oakland Athletics, Anaheim Angels, Seattle Mariners and St. Louis Cardinals
 Bill Sudakis (born 1946), third baseman for six MLB teams

Basketball 

 Cathy Boswell (born 1962), 1984 Gold Medal Olympian USA women's basketball
 Bulbs Ehlers (1923–2013), played basketball for Purdue and NBA's Boston Celtics
 Terry Gannon (born 1963), player for North Carolina State 1983 NCAA champions, sportscaster for NBC Sports and the Golf Channel 
 Bill Jones (born 1958), center for Northern Iowa Panthers and in Australia's National Basketball League; captained Adelaide 36ers to 1986 NBL Championship
 George Mikan (1924–2005), Hall of Fame center and coach for DePaul and five-time NBA champion Minneapolis Lakers
 Roger Powell (born 1983), small forward for Illinois 2005 NCAA finalists and NBA's Utah Jazz
 Allie Quigley (born 1986), All-Star guard for WNBA's Chicago Sky
 Alando Tucker (born 1984), small forward and shooting guard for Wisconsin, 2007 Big Ten Player of the Year; NBA's Phoenix Suns

Football 

 Mike Alstott (born 1973), fullback, 6-time Pro Bowl selection for Super Bowl XXXVII champion Tampa Bay Buccaneers
 Pete Bercich (born 1971), player and assistant coach for Minnesota Vikings
 Gordie Gillespie (1926–2015), college football coach
 Harlan Gustafson (1917–1984), 1939 All-America end for University of Pennsylvania
 Eric Parker (born 1979), wide receiver for Houston Texans and San Diego Chargers
 Daniel Ruettiger (born 1948), college football player, motivational speaker; inspiration for film Rudy
 Eric Steinbach (born 1980), guard for Cincinnati Bengals 2003–2006 and Cleveland Browns 2007–2010
 Tom Thayer (born 1961), center and guard for NFL's Chicago Bears and Miami Dolphins
 Jim Valek (born 1928), player and head coach for University of Illinois

Martial arts 

 Randall Kleck, martial artist; World Karate Union Hall of Fame

Motorsports

 Danny Kladis, Indianapolis 500 driver and inductee of the National Midget Auto Racing Hall of Fame

Wrestling

 Juice Robinson, professional wrestler in New Japan Pro-Wrestling, 3rd IWGP United States Heavyweight Champion

References

Joliet
Joliet